José David Casado García (born 14 January 1988) is a Spanish footballer.

Club career
In July 2014, he signed a 2-year contract with Spartak Trnava. He made his league debut for them on 13 July 2014 against Zlaté Moravce.

References

External links
 
 Futbalnet Liga profile
 Eurofotbal profile

1988 births
Living people
Footballers from Almería
Spanish footballers
Association football midfielders
Segunda División B players
Tercera División players
CD Comarca de Níjar players
SCR Peña Deportiva players
Nemzeti Bajnokság II players
Kazincbarcikai SC footballers
Slovak Super Liga players
2. Liga (Slovakia) players
3. Liga (Slovakia) players
TJ OFC Gabčíkovo players
FC Spartak Trnava players
FC ViOn Zlaté Moravce players
MFK Zemplín Michalovce players
FK Slavoj Trebišov players
Liga I players
Liga II players
FC Botoșani players
SSU Politehnica Timișoara players
Czech First League players
1. FK Příbram players
Spanish expatriate footballers
Spanish expatriate sportspeople in Hungary
Spanish expatriate sportspeople in Slovakia
Spanish expatriate sportspeople in Romania
Spanish expatriate sportspeople in the Czech Republic
Expatriate footballers in Hungary
Expatriate footballers in Slovakia
Expatriate footballers in Romania
Expatriate footballers in the Czech Republic